Football in Southern Italy in 1919–20 was still organized at an experimental and amatorial level.

The tournaments were organized in three regions, Tuscany, Latium and Campania. Differently from the pre-war period, six clubs advanced to a general final tournament.

Qualifications

Tuscany

Classification

Results table

Lazio

Classification

Results table

Campania

Classification

Results table

Semifinals
Two triangular semifinals were introduced.

Group A

Classification

Results table

Group B

Classification

Results table

Final round
Played on 13 June 1920, in Bologna.

Footnotes

See also
Football in Southern Italy in 1920–21

Football in Italy